ŽNK Rijeka is a Croatian women's association football club based in Rijeka. They compete in the Croatian Women's First Football League.

History
The club was founded on 27 August 1998 by four sisters (Brankica Lukanić, Ružica Gregov, Hermina Trošelj, Ankica Kovačić) as ŽNK Jack Pot. The club participated in futsal competitions until 2007, when they formed a senior association football team and changed their name to Rijeka-Jack Pot. They competed in the Croatian Women's First Football League for seven consecutive seasons. In April 2015, due to financial issues, the club announced their withdrawal from the 2014–15 Croatian Women's First Football League. In May 2015, the name was changed to ŽNK Rijeka. From the 2015–16 season, the club has been affiliated with HNK Rijeka and has adopted its brand. In 2017, ŽNK Rijeka returned to the First Division.

Recent seasons

External links
Official website

References

Women's football clubs in Croatia
Football clubs in Rijeka
Football clubs in Primorje-Gorski Kotar County
Association football clubs established in 1998
Sport in Rijeka
1998 establishments in Croatia
ŽNK Rijeka